Monster Bug Wars is a nature documentary program, created and distributed by Beyond Television Productions, and televised on the Science Channel in the United States, and SBS in Australia. The monster movie format features two kinds of insects, arachnids, myriapods, and other invertebrates in gladiator style combat in a simulated natural environment. In intermittent breaks, entomologists educate the viewer about the strengths and weaknesses of the dueling arthropods.

The opening narration is "In nature's fight pit, a host of ruthless bugs as bizarre as they are lethal slug it out in real-life battles to the death. Witness epic encounters between swarms of marauding assassins, and vicious one-on-one clashes where only one bug survives. The world of monster bugs is a jungle, where there's just one law: eat or be eaten."

Premise 
The program highlights The Law of the Jungle involving two arthropods of different species, both usually being carnivorous. They are shown fighting to the death with the victor devouring the victim in graphic detail. The program is noted for its use of dramatic theme music and unusual sound editing—during combat, the sounds of growling, screaming, war cries, and shrieks of agony, to name but a few, are heard. In addition, other military and ringside sound effects such as bells, bugles, whistles and alarms are occasionally added. Of course, none of these sounds are natural and are only added to enhance the dramatic effect. However, some viewers have stated these sound effects are silly and do nothing but make a good documentary program into something rather comical. It has been noted that season two has much less sound effects than season one. Despite the odd sound effects, the invertebrate specialists managing the animals for the series took great care to ensure all the interactions were those between species that naturally interact and prey upon one another in the wild. This was the result of hundreds of hours of field observation and years of experience with the various species. Like the vast majority of macro productions, this was filmed in a studio situation to allow for controlled lighting and camera operation. It utilized large natural sets which enabled the animals to behave as they would in nature.
Between shots of the fight, the two entomologist hosts of the program narrate the action. Dr. Linda Rayor of Cornell University and Associate Professor Dr. Bryan Grieg Fry of University of Queensland describe each arthropod's abilities that give it an advantage over the other. The entomologists often try to predict the winner of the two.
 The program is narrated by Henry Strozier.

In Australia, the program began airing on SBS on November 14, 2012. It features re-voiced narration by Dr. Paul Willis of RIAUS, as well as a longer running time due to additional narrated footage.
Eden began airing the series on February 29, 2016 in the United Kingdom.

Production 
The series premiered in 2009. The first season started in 2011 and had a run of six episodes. The series was renewed for 2012 with another six episodes produced.

Episodes

Series overview 

In the following episode listings, winners are in bold.

Pilot (2009)

Season 1 (2011)

Season 2 (2012)

Special (2012) 
Monster Bug Wars Top 10 is a second season compilation episode released in July 2012. This episode included 10 already released bug fights that have been shortened. The following battles are listed below:

References

External links 
 
 
 
 

2011 American television series debuts
2012 American television series endings
2010s American documentary television series
Television series about insects
Television series by Beyond Television Productions
Fiction about death games